Presidential elections are scheduled to be held in Chad in 2024.

Electoral system
The President of Chad is elected for a five-year term using a two-round system, with an absolute majority required in the first round to prevent a second round of voting.

References

Chad
Presidential election
Presidential elections in Chad